Nasty Beatmakers are an American record production duo, composed of brothers DJ Nasty (Johnny David Mollings) and LVM (Leonardo V. Mollings).

The duo produced Lil Wayne's "I'm Me", Plies's "#1 Fan", and Ludacris's "Grew Up a Screw Up".

Early life and career beginnings
DJ Nasty and LVM were both born in Cuba, and came to the United States in 1988 due to their father being in the Navy; he "wanted a change in scenery", states Nasty.  DJ Nasty early on met DJ Khaled and another associate named Ceaser and started Hitmen Productions. They were doing local house parties and renting out halls, and soon started to make a big name for themselves in Orlando, Florida. The group eventually broke up.

Discography

References

External links
Article in Ozone magazine
Interview in Pure Cash magazine

American hip hop record producers
American musical duos
Businesspeople from Florida
Cash Money Records artists
Family musical groups
Hip hop duos
Musicians from Florida
Record production duos
Sibling musical duos
Southern hip hop musicians
African-American record producers